The Australian Volunteers for International Development (AVID) program is an initiative of the Australian Government's Department of Foreign Affairs and Trade.

The AVID program allows Australians to share skills and foster linkages with people and organizations in developing countries to make a difference as part of Australia’s overseas aid program. The program is delivered on behalf of the Australian Government by three Core Partners; Scope Global, formerly known as Austraining international, Australian Volunteers International, and the Australian Red Cross.

The volunteers come from a diverse range of backgrounds, which include men and women aged from 18 to 80 years. Australian volunteers have varying professional backgrounds which enable them to work on a range of activities such as establishing medical clinics so that women can give birth safely, building stronger homes to withstand cyclones and helping children with disabilities to get to school.

The AVID program places volunteers with Host Organizations (HOs) in Asia, the Pacific and Africa. HOs are the organizations in which volunteers undertake their assignments. Hosts can be government departments, international agencies, non-government organizations (NGOs) at provincial, local, national and international level, educational institutions, research institutes or private companies. Each assignment is developed in line with Australian Government priorities and are sourced depending on the priorities and needs of the host country.

The AVID program also works with Australian Partner Organizations (APOs) to develop and support Australian volunteer assignments. APOs are Australian organizations and are drawn from government departments, non-government organizations, educational institutions and private companies that have or wish to establish links with organizations working in development in Asia, the Pacific and Africa.

For example, APOs work together with HOs to develop Australian volunteer assignment proposals, assist in advertising to potential volunteers and provide mentoring, advice and support to volunteers throughout their assignments. HOs do not need to have an APO to submit an assignment to the AVID program.

Assignments are posted online on the first day of each month at www.australianaidvolunteers.gov.au

References 

Volunteering in Australia
International development programs